Dawinkopf is a mountain in Tyrol, Austria.

Mountains of the Alps
Mountains of Tyrol (state)
Lechtal Alps